Pedro Gilberto Vargas Moreno (born November 20, 1991, in Matamoros, Tamaulipas) is a Mexican professional footballer who last played for Fernández Vial in the Primera B de Chile.

Career
In September 2021, Vargas moved to Chile and joined Fernández Vial in the Primera B. In July 2022, he left the club having made nine appearances.

References

External links
 
 
 Pedro Vargas at ChiapasFC

Living people
1991 births
Mexican footballers
Mexican expatriate footballers
Association football midfielders
Tampico Madero F.C. footballers
Altamira F.C. players
Cafetaleros de Chiapas footballers
Chiapas F.C. footballers
Pioneros de Cancún footballers
Atlante F.C. footballers
C.D. Arturo Fernández Vial footballers
Liga MX players
Ascenso MX players
Liga Premier de México players
Tercera División de México players
Primera B de Chile players
Expatriate footballers in Chile
Mexican expatriate sportspeople in Chile
Footballers from Tamaulipas
People from Matamoros, Tamaulipas